The Gaylactic Spectrum Awards are given to works of science fiction, fantasy and horror which explore LGBT (lesbian, gay, bisexual or transgender) topics in a positive way. They were founded in 1998, first presented by the Gaylactic Network in 1999, and in 2002 they were given their own organization, the Gaylactic Spectrum Awards Foundation.

Awards are given in categories for novels, short fiction and best other work, although in some years the award for short fiction has not been presented due to lack of sufficient nominees or no nominee of high enough quality. Other categories have also been added and removed in intervening years, and works produced before the inception of the awards are eligible to be inducted into the "Hall of Fame". Each award consists of an etched image on lucite on a stand, using a spiral galaxy in a triangle logo, based on the logo of the Gaylactic Network. The award winner's name, work title, award year and award category are etched on a small plaque on the base or on the plexiglass itself. No cash award is associated with the other work award, and the cost of the awards is paid for through individual donations and fundraising events.

The other works category is open to submissions of works in any non-novel, non-short-fiction medium released during the prior calendar year in North America that includes "significant positive GLBT content". This includes: comic books, graphic novels, movies, television episodes, multimedia, anthologies, story collections, gaming products, artwork, music. The time-frame of eligibility is based on copyright date for first printing for written works, cover date for magazines and comic books, release date for films, and the first air date for television. The long list of nominees is reduced to a short list of finalists, and the results are generally announced and presented at Gaylaxicon, although they have also been presented at Worldcon in the past. This article lists all the "Best short fiction" award nominees and winners, and short fiction hall of fame inductees.

Nicola Griffith is the only creator to have won the other work award more than once, having won twice for editing anthologies; she was also nominated for once for her writing. The creators of Buffy the Vampire Slayer have the record for most nominations, with five, one of which won the award. Cecilia Tan has the record for most nominations without winning, having been a finalist three times for editing anthologies. The most recent winners of the award are an anthology of LGBT themed science fiction entitled The Future Is Queer, edited by Richard Labonté and Lawrence Schimel, the television series Torchwood, created by Russell T Davies, and the film V for Vendetta, all in 2007. No award was presented to any of the works in the 2008 shortlist.

Winners and nominees
In the following table, the years correspond to the year of work's release; the ceremonies are always held the following year. Entries in bold and with a lavender background have won the relevant award; those that are neither highlighted nor in bold are the finalist nominees. Superscript letters after the result indicate simultaneous nominations in other categories, or other notes.

 People's Choice award winner.
 A separate Best Comic Book / Graphic novel category was created for one year.

Other works Hall of Fame inductees
In the following table, the years correspond to the year of the award ceremonies; the works were all first published or broadcast before the founding of the awards in 1998. Listed here are all the works short listed for entry in the Hall of Fame that are not novels or short stories. A separate "Hall of Fame Media" category was created for the year 2000.

See also

 Homosexuality in speculative fiction
 Lambda Literary Awards winners and nominees for science fiction, fantasy and horror
 Gaylactic Spectrum Award winners and nominees for best novel
 Gaylactic Spectrum Award winners and nominees for best short fiction

References
General
 
 

Specific

External links
 The Gaylactic Spectrum Awards official site

Best other work
Lists of LGBT-related award winners and nominees
Lists of speculative fiction-related award winners and nominees